Arapapıştı Canyon is a canyon at Bozdoğan district of Aydın Province in western Turkey.

It is a canyon formed by the Akçay River feeding Kemer Dam. The length of the canyon is 6 kilometres and the height is 380 metres. A part of the canyon is located on the border of Aydın, Denizli and Muğla provinces. In 2017, it was opened to tourism by Aydın Metropolitan Municipality.

References

Canyons and gorges of Turkey
Landforms of Aydın Province
Tourist attractions in Aydın Province
Bozdoğan District